The nectar resource in a given area depends on the kinds of flowering plants present and their blooming periods.  Which kinds grow in an area depends on soil texture, soil pH, soil drainage, daily maximum and minimum temperatures, precipitation, extreme minimum winter temperature, and growing degree days.  The plants listed below grow in USDA hardiness zone 5.  A good predictor for when a plant will bloom and produce nectar is a calculation of the growing degree days. Hopkins' bioclimatic law states that in North America east of the Rockies, a 130-m (400-foot) increase in elevation, a 4° change in latitude North (444.48 km), or a 10° change in longitude East (two-thirds of a time zone) will cause a biological event to occur four days later in the spring or four days earlier in the fall.
In botany, the term phenology refers to the timing of flower emergence, sequence of bloom, fruiting, and leaf drop in autumn.

The classification in major or minor nectar sources is very dependent on the agricultural use of the land.  An agricultural crop such as canola or alfalfa may be a major or minor source depending on local plantings.  Generally, the more diverse a forage area is, the better for a stationary apiary.  Urban, suburban, and uncultivated areas provide more consistent warm-season nectar forage than areas that are heavily cultivated with only a few agricultural crops.  The nectar sources from large cultivated fields of blooming apples, cherries, canola, melons, sunflowers, clover, etc. benefit a bee keeper who is willing to travel with his hives throughout the season.

Honeydew sources are not included in this listing.

Trees and shrubs

Flowers, crops, herbs, and grasses 

{| class="wikitable sortable"
!Plant type
!Common name
!Latin name
!Perennial/annual
!Begin bloom month
!End bloom month
!Monofloral honey
!Availability
!Nectar production
|-
|F
|Anise hyssop
|Agastache foeniculum
|Perennial
|7
|10
|no
|feral
|minor (1858–2787 kg/ha)
|-
|F
|Blue bugle, bugleherb, bugleweed, carpetweed, common bugle
|Ajuga reptans
|Perennial
|5
|6
|
|feral
|minor
|-
|F
|Chives
|Allium schoenoprasum
|Perennial
|5
|9
|no
|cultivated
|minor
|-
|C, F
|Garlic chives
|Allium tuberosa
|Perennial
|8
|9
|no
|cultivated
|minor
|-
|F
|Leadwort
|Amorpha fruticosa
|Perennial
|6
|7
|no
|feral
|minor
|-
|F
|Milkweed
|Asclepias spp.  55 species
|Perennial
|7
|8
|
|feral, all species are great for honeybees, nectar is so abundant that shaking the blossoms allows visible nectar fall
|major – 120–250 lb/acre, depending on soil and if good fertilization, Asclepias syriaca has the highest honey yield.
|-
|F
|Butterfly weed
|Asclepias tuberosa
|Perennial
|7
|8
|no
|feral
|minor
|-
|C
|Asparagus
|Asparagus officinalis
|Perennial
|5
|6
|no
|cultivated
|minor
|-
|F
|Milk vetch
|Astragalus spp.
|Perennial
|5
|6
|no
|feral
|minor
|-
|F
|Aster
|Aster spp.
|Perennial
|8
|10
|usually mixed with goldenrod
|feral, ornamental
|major
|-
|F
|Borage
|Borago officinalis
|Annual
|6
|10
|no
|feral, ornamental
|minor, but can be major on cultivated area, 200 lb/acre honey,  60–160 lb pollen
|-
|C, F
|Mustard
|Brassica arvenisis
|Annual
|4
|5
|no?
|cultivated
|minor
|-
|C
|Oil rapeseed (canola)
|Brassica napus L., Brassica rapa
|Annual
|5
|6
|yes
|cultivated
|major
|-
|F
|Marigold
|Calendula officinalis
|Annual
|6
|9
|no
|ornamental
|minor
|-
|F
|Canada thistle
|Carduus arvensis
|Perennial
|
|
|light honey of good quality
|
|
|-
|F
|Thistle
|Centaurea spp.
|Annual
|7
|9
|no
|feral
|minor
|-
|F
|Mountain bluet
|Centaurea Montana (Knapweed)
|Short-lived Perennial
|5
|5
|no??
|feral
|major
|-
|F
|Creeping thistle
|Cirsium arvense
|Perennial
|7
|9
|
|feral (invasive in North America)
|
|-
|F
|Sweet autumn clematis
|Clematis terniflora
|Perennial
|9
|9
|
|ornamental
|minor
|-
|F
|Clethra, summersweet
|Clethra alnifolia
|Perennial (shrub)
|7
|8
|no
|feral
|minor
|-
|C, F
|Cucumber
|
|Annual
|6
|9
|no; honey is pale yellow or amber with strong flavor
|cultivated
|minor
|-
|C
|Melon
|
|Annual
|6
|10
|no
|cultivated
|minor
|-
|C
|Pumpkin
|Cucurbita pepo L.
|Annual
|6
|10
|no
|cultivated
|minor
|-
|C, F
|Wild carrot
|Daucus carota
|Biennial
|8
|9
|no
|feral
|minor
|-
|F
|Leopard's bane
|Doronicum cordatum
|Perennial
|4
|5
|no
|feral
|minor
|-
|F
|Candytuft
|Iberis sempervirens
|Perennial
|5
|5
|
|
|
|-
|F
|Viper's bugloss, blue thistle, 
|Echium vulgare Echium vulgare is most widely known, though  about 60 additional species exist
|Perennial
|6
|8
|no
|feral In California, spring-blooming plant with repeat bloom, fall bloom provides nectar for bees for overwintering. The most unusual feature of E. vulgare is the protection of the nectar inside the flower from vaporization (when weather is hot) or flushing away (when  rains). 
|major – 300–1,000 lb/acre honey depending on soil, 500–2000 lb of dark blue pollen
|-
|F
|Globe thistle
|Echinops ritro
|Annual
|8
|8
|
|feral
|major
|-
|F
|Fireweed
|Epilobium angustifolium
|Perennial
|6
|9
|yes
|feral
|major
|-
|F
|Heather
|Erica vulgaris, though many varieties
|Perennial (shrub)
|
|
|see Monofloral honey
|
|100–200 lb honey
|-
|F
|Joe-Pye weed, boneset, white snakeroot
|Eutrochium spp., "Eupatorium spp., Eupatorium purpureum; Eupatorium perfoliatum; Eupatorium ageratoides|Perennial
|8
|9
|no
|feral
|minor
|-
|C, F
|Buckwheat
|Fagopyrum esculentum|Annual
|7
|8
|can be, dark honey with distinct flavor, granulates quickly
|rarely cultivated now
|minor
|-
|F
|Blue vine
|Gonolobus laevis|Perennial
|
|
|no, honey is clear, heavy bodied, of excellent flavor
|feral
|minor, strong hives can collect up to 100 lb
|-
|C, F
|Soybean
|Glycine soja|Annual
|7
|10
|
|cultivated
|major
|-
|C, F
|Sunflower
|Helianthus annuus|Annual
|6
|9
|can be
|feral, cultivated
|minor – 30–100 pounds/acre
|-
|C, F
|Basil
|Koellia|Annual
|
|
|no
|cultivated
|minor
|-
|F
|Henbit, deadnettle
|Lamium sp|Perennial
|3
|5
|no
|feral
|minor, but valuable due to earliness/frost hardiness
|-
|C, F
|Lavender
|Lavandula angustifolia|Perennial (shrub)
|6
|9
|can be
|cultivated
|minor
|-
|F
|Birdsfoot trefoil
|Lotus corniculatus|Perennial
|6
|8
|no
|feral
|minor
|-
|C, F
|White sweet clover
|Melilotus alba|Biennial
|5
|8
|yes
|feral, cultivated
|major up to 200 lb per hive
|-
|C, F
|Yellow sweet clover
|Melilotus officinalis|Biennial
|5
|8
|yes
|feral, cultivated
|major up to 200 lb per hive
|-
|C, F
|Alfalfa
|Medicago sativa|Perennial
|7
|8
|as clover honey, alfalfa honey granulates readily
|feral, cultivated
|major
|-
|C, F
|Clover
|Melilotus spp. and Trifolium spp.
|Biennial
|5
|8
|as clover honey
|feral, cultivated
|major – up to 500 lb/acre in a good year
|-
|F
|Melissa, lemon balm
|Melissa officinalis|Perennial
|
|
|
|Western US – Prolonged bloom of 45 – 50 days generally in summer, but with repeat blooming in California. Delicate honey with very light, pinkish color.
|150–250 lb/acre honey, 50–120 lb pollen
|-
|C, F
|Peppermint
|Mentha piperita|Perennial
|
|
|no
|feral
|
|-
|F
|Catnip, cat mint
|Nepeta mussinii; Nepeta grandiflora; Nepeta cataria|Perennial
|6
|9
|no
|feral, ornamental
|minor
|-
|F
|Oregano
|Origanum vulgare|Perennial
|6
|9
|no
|cultivated?
|minor
|-
|C, F
|Poppy
|Papaver somniferum|Perennial
|
|
|
|
|minor – 20–30 lb/acre
|-
|C, F
|Phacelia, tansy
|Phacelia tanacetifolia|Perennial
|
|
|
|Western US – One of the best spring forage sources for honeybees. Blooms 45–60 days and continuously produces nectar throughout the day. Can be seeded several times per year. Prefers 3 ft of topsoil.
|180–1,500 pounds honey per acre, depending on soil quality and depth; 300–1000 pounds of pollen.
|-
|G, H
|Plantain
|Plantago Major|Perennial
|7
|
|
|
|
|-
|F
|Smartweed
|Polygonum spp.
|Perennial
|8
|9
|
|feral
|major
|-
|F
|Selfheal
|Prunella vulgaris|Perennial
|7
|8
|no
|feral
|minor
|-
|F
|Lungwort
|Pulmonaria spp.
|Perennial
|5
|5
|no
|feral
|minor
|-
|F
|Appalachian mountain mint
|Pycnanthemum flexuosum|Perennial
|8
|10
|
|
|minor
|-
|F
|Azalea
|Rhododendron spp.
|Perennial
|6
|8
|no
|ornamental
|minor
|-
|F
|Russian sage
|Salvia yangii|Perennial
|7
|9
|can be
|ornamental
|minor
|-
|F
|Scrophularia|Scrophularia spp.
|Perennial
|7
|7
|no
|feral
|minor
|-
|F
|Sedum, autumn joy
|Sedum spectabile|Perennial
|
|
|
|
|
|-
|F
|Goldenrod
|Solidago spp.
|Perennial
|9
|10
|can be, honey golden color of deep amber; marked flavor; granulates quickly
|feral
|major
|-
|F
|Woundwort
|Stachys byzantina|Perennial
|5
|5
|no
|feral
|minor
|-
|F
|Chickweed
|Stellaria media|Annual
|4
|7
|no
|feral
|minor
|-
|F
|Dandelion
|Taraxacum officinale|Annual
|4
|5
|no, honey deep yellow, granulates quickly; mostly consumed by bees during brood rearing
|feral
|major
|-
|F
|Germander
|Teucrium canadense|Perennial
|7
|8
|no
|feral
|minor
|-
|F
|Thyme
|Thymus pulegioides; Thymus serpyllum|Perennial
|6
|7
|no
|feral, cultivated
|minor – 50–150 lb/acre honey
|-
|F
|Red-flowering thyme
|Thymus praecox|Perennial
|6
|7
|
|feral?
|major
|-
|C, F
|Alsike clover
|Trifolium hybridum|Perennial
|
|
|as clover honey, alsike clover honey is one of the best honey plants in America.
|feral, cultivated
|major, up to 500 lb/acre
|-
|C, F
|Crimson clover
|Trifolium incarnatum|Perennial
|
|
|as clover honey
|feral, cultivated
|major
|-
|C, F
|Red clover
|Trifolium pratense|Perennial
|6
|7
|as clover honey
|feral, cultivated
|major
|-
|C, F
|White clover
|Trifolium repens|Perennial
|6
|7
|as clover honey; honey is white or nearly white; very mild flavored and does not granulate readily
|feral, cultivated
|major
|-
|F
|Blue vervain
|Verbena hastata L.
|Perennial
|7
|8
|no
|ornamental?
|minor
|-
|F
|Tall ironweed
|Vernonia altissima|Perennial
|8
|9
|no
|feral
|minor
|-
|F
|Speedwell
|Veronica spicata|Perennial
|6
|6
|no
|feral
|minor
|-
|F
|Tufted vetch, common vetch
|Vicia cracca|Perennial
|7
|8
|no
|feral
|minor
|-
|F
|Common vetch
|Vicia sativa|Perennial
|7
|8
|no
|feral
|minor
|-
|F
|Blackhaw
|Viburnum prunifolium|Perennial (shrub)
|5
|6
|no
|feral
|minor
|}

 Garden plants to feed honey bees in Canada 
 Aster
 Bluebells (Hyacinthoides)
 Clematis
 Cornflowers (Centaurea cyanus)
 Cosmos
 Crocus
 Hellebore
 Lavandula
 Marigold (Calendula officinalis)
 Mint (Mentha)
 Primula
 Rosemary
 Rudbeckia
 Sunflower (Helianthus)

 Gallery 

 See also 
 Forage (honey bee)
 List of honey plants
 List of honeydew sources
 Nectar source
 List of pollen sources
 Melliferous flower
 Regional honeys

 References 

 Further reading 
 Agriculture and Agri-Food Canada. (2017). Planting Forage for Honey Bees in Canada (PDF).
 Chan, S. (2012). A Landowner's Guide to Conserving Native Pollinators in Ontario (PDF) Magnini, R. (2011). Honey Plants of Eastern Canada: A Field Guide''. Sweet Clover Productions. 

Beekeeping in the United States
Nectar sources for honey bees
Lists of flowers
Lists of plants
Lists of trees
Crops
Agriculture-related lists
Gardening lists
Nectar sources for honey bees